The Sikh Gurdwara of San Francisco is a Sikh gurdwara in the Peninsula, just south of San Francisco in San Mateo, California.

Overview 
The Sikh Gurdwara of San Francisco was established in April 2012.

There is a monthly program held in San Mateo, just south of San Francisco. The Gurdwara is easy to get to and is centrally located at the corner of Highway 92 and Alameda de Las Pulgas - about equal distance from Highway 280 and Highway 101:

1700 Alameda De las Pulgas
San Mateo, CA 94403

The Sikh Gurdwara of San Francisco location is a temporary location that is being used. Funds are being raised to find a permanent site which will be based somewhere in San Mateo County. This is the first Sikh Gurdwara that is easily reached without crossing the bridge from the San Francisco Peninsula to the East Bay or driving to the South Bay.

Sikhs and non-Sikhs are welcome to attend the Gurdwara.

See also 
 Gurdwaras in the United States

References

External links 
 San Francisco Sikh Gurdwara
 San Francisco Sikh Gurdwara on Facebook

San Francisco
Religious buildings and structures in California
San Mateo, California
Religious organizations established in 2012
San Francisco
2012 establishments in California